Phyllachora is a genus of fungi in the family Phyllachoraceae. An Outline of Fungi in 2020 listed up to 1513 species.

Phyllachora queenslandica (from Australia) is found on shrub Neolitsea dealbata.

Species
A selected few are shown here;

Phyllachora arthraxonis

Phyllachora banksiae
Phyllachora cannabis

Phyllachora chloridis
Phyllachora chrysopogonicola
Phyllachora cynodonticola
Phyllachora cynodontis
Phyllachora eleusines
Phyllachora ermidensis
Phyllachora furnasensis
Phyllachora graminis
Phyllachora gratissima
Phyllachora hainanensis

Phyllachora jianfengensis
Phyllachora keralensis
Phyllachora leveilleana
 Phyllachora maydis (causes Tar spot on corn)
Phyllachora melicicola
Phyllachora microstegia 
Phyllachora miscanthi
Phyllachora musicola

Phyllachora panicicola
Phyllachora pennisetina
Phyllachora phyllostachydis
Phyllachora pogonatheri
Phyllachora pomigena
Phyllachora phyllostachydis 
Phyllachora qualeae

Phyllachora sacchari

Phyllachora thysanolaenae
Phyllachora tjapukiensis
Phyllachora truncatispora
Phyllachora vulgata

See List of Phyllachora species (for full list of species)

References

Sordariomycetes genera
Phyllachorales